Megophrys parallela is a species of frog in the family Megophryidae. It is endemic to Sumatra and known from a number of localities on mountains along the island's western coast where it is expected to have a wide distribution.

Description
Adult males measure  and adult females, based on a single specimen,  in snout–vent length, without the rostral appendage. The habitus is stocky and robust. The head is wider than the body. The snout is short but with a pointed tip. The canthus rostralis is sharp. The tympanum is small and posteriorly obscured by skin;; the supratympanic fold is sharply angular. The upper eyelid has a short and several low, conical tubercles. The fingers and the toes have rounded but not enlarged tips; the toes have basal webbing. The dorsolateral folds are parallel (hence the specific name parallela). Preserved specimens are dorsally dark gray to brown with a number of dark markings, including a backward-pointing triangular interorbital marking. The abdomen is cream with varying amounts of brown mottling.

Habitat and conservation
It has been found in both primary and secondary forest, indicating a degree of tolerance to habitat degradation. Specimens have found on dead leaves, on a small log on the bank of a small stream, and in cracks of rocks. Reproduction presumably involves stream-living tadpoles.

Megophrys parallela does not appear to be common, although this might reflect its quiet call and cryptic habits. It is probably threatened by habitat loss and degradation caused by logging and deforestation. However, it does occur in a number of protected areas.

References

parallela
Frogs of Asia
Amphibians of Indonesia
Endemic fauna of Sumatra
Amphibians described in 2005
Taxa named by Robert F. Inger
Taxonomy articles created by Polbot